Penicillium wotroi is a species of fungus in the genus Penicillium which was isolated from soil in the Colombian Amazon forest.

References

wotroi
Fungi described in 2011